Johan Leonard Hagen (1849 - ??) was a Norwegian politician for the Liberal Party.

He was elected to the Norwegian Parliament in 1892, representing the constituency of Tromsø Amt. He only served one term. He worked as a telegrapher.

References

1849 births
Year of death missing
Liberal Party (Norway) politicians
Members of the Storting
Troms politicians